{{DISPLAYTITLE:C26H27NO}}
The molecular formula C26H27NO (molar mass: 369.50 g/mol, exact mass: 369.2093 u) may refer to:

 JWH-048
 JWH-116
 JWH-149
 JWH-210

Molecular formulas